The vice president of the Philippines is the second-highest executive official in the government of the Philippines. The vice president is directly elected by qualified voters to a six-year term, and may be a cabinet member without confirmation from the Commission on Appointments and is first in the presidential line of succession. There have been 15 vice presidents.

History 
The office of vice president was initially created following the ratification of the 1935 Constitution of the Philippines, which states that the vice-president shall be elected by direct vote of the people. Vice presidents during the Commonwealth of the Philippines were under American sovereignty, and there was no office of vice president during the Second Republic, which was considered to be a puppet state of Imperial Japan during World War II. During the martial law declared by President Ferdinand Marcos from 1972 to 1981, the office of the vice-president was abolished and the sitting vice-president, Fernando Lopez, was removed from the office. Though the 1973 Constitution initially did not provide for a vice president, subsequent amendments restored the office. A vice president was appointed after the 1986 election when Marcos and Arturo Tolentino were proclaimed as winners by the Batasang Pambansa. However, in 1986, the People Power Revolution overthrew Macros' dictatorship and repealed the 1973 Constitution. The subsequently formed 1987 Constitution of the Philippines was established, which states that: "There shall be a vice-president who shall have the same qualifications and term of office and be elected with, and in the same manner, as the president."

Before the ratification of the 1987 constitution, in case of an intra-term vacancy, there was no process to appoint a new vice president until after the next election. However, after the ratification of the 1987 constitution, the president could nominate a vice president in case of an intra-term vacancy from a member of the congress, whom both houses vote separately for confirmation by a majority vote. In 2001, Gloria Macapagal Arroyo became president after the Supreme Court of the Philippines ruled that President Joseph Estrada resigned. A few days later, she appointed Teofisto Guingona as the vice president.

Three vice presidents have succeeded to the presidency due to the death of presidents: Sergio Osmeña in 1944, Elpidio Quirino in 1948, and Carlos P. Garcia in 1957. Fernando Lopez was the longest-serving vice-president, who served for a combined total of almost 11 years. Elpidio Quirino served the shortest time as vice-president for approximately 1 year 11 months. Sara Duterte is the current vice president.

Vice presidents

Timeline

Unofficial vice presidents 
Historians and other figures have identified the following people as having held the vice-presidency of a government intended to represent the Philippines, but their terms of office are not counted by the Philippine government as part of the presidential succession.

The inclusion of Mariano Trías in the list is disputed, because Trias was chosen as vice-president at the Tejeros Convention, and again as vice-president for the short-lived Republic of Biak-na-Bato, which was dissolved after the signing of the Pact of Biak-na-Bato and Aguinaldo's exile. Neither the reassumption of power by Emilio Aguinaldo when the revolution was resumed in May 1898 nor his formal proclamation and inauguration as President under the First Philippine Republic in 1899 were regimes that provided for a vice-presidency.

See also 
 President of the Philippines
 List of presidents of the Philippines
 Prime Minister of the Philippines (defunct)

Notes

References

Works cited 

Books and journals
 
 
 
 
 
 

Articles
 
 
 
 
 
 
 
 
 
 
 
 
 
 
 
 
 
 
 
 
 
 
 
 
 
 
 

Online sources
 
 
 
 
 
 
 
 
 
 
 

Vice-Presidents
Philippines